Robert Edwin McAlpine, Baron McAlpine of Moffat (23 April 1907 – 7 January 1990), grandson of Sir Robert McAlpine, 1st Baronet, was a British construction magnate who headed Sir Robert McAlpine Ltd.

Career
Edwin was the second son of William Hepburn McAlpine. In common with his elder brother Tom and younger brother Malcolm, he joined the family firm when he left Oundle School at the age of 18, becoming a partner in the 1950s. In 1955, he became deputy chairman of the Nuclear Power Plant Co., becoming the chairman four years later, overseeing the construction of seven nuclear power stations for Sir Robert McAlpine.

He was knighted in 1963 and was made a life peer as Baron McAlpine of Moffat, of Medmenham in the County of Buckinghamshire on 21 February 1980. He inherited the family baronetcy in 1983 on the death of his brother Tom.

He was an enthusiastic racehorse breeder and owned his own stud at Henley-on-Thames, was chairman of Sandown Park Racecourse and was a frequent gambler.

Family
On 8 December 1930 McAlpine married Ella Mary Gardner Garnett (d. 1987). They had four children: Patricia (b. 1932), William (1936–2018), (Robert) Alistair (1942–2014), and David (b. 1946). The sons also joined the family firm.

Arms

References

Further reading
 "Lord McApline of Moffat", The Times (London), 8 January 1990, p. 18.

1907 births
1990 deaths
20th-century British businesspeople
Conservative Party (UK) life peers
Presidents of the Smeatonian Society of Civil Engineers
Edwin
Baronets in the Baronetage of the United Kingdom
Knights Bachelor
Life peers created by Elizabeth II